Zdeno Štrba (born 9 June 1976) is a Slovak professional footballer who plays as a defensive midfielder for TJ Slovan Skalité. He played 25 games for the Slovakia national team.

Club career
Štrba started at local club Tatran Krásno nad Kysucou and through youth squad of Dukla Banská Bystrica came to Matador Púchov where he made his Corgoň Liga debut. He played for Matador four-and-a-half season and then moved to MŠK Žilina in January 2003. Štrba won six trophies in Žilina, the Corgoň Liga and the Slovak Super Cup three times, and progressed to the Slovakia national team as stable member. On 3 June 2009, Štrba has signed two-year contract for Skoda Xanthi for a fee €150,000. He made 27 appearances and scored 4 goals in his first season at the Super League Greece. In December 2010, he terminated his contract with Xanthi after mutual consent and came back to Žilina, signing one-and-a-half-year contract.

International career
Štrba played his first international match against Cyprus on 13 February 2003. He was present in six of the ten matches at the 2010 World Cup qualification and Slovakia manager Vladimír Weiss called up him to the final 23-men squad for the 2010 FIFA World Cup. Štrba played overall 267 minutes at the tournament against New Zealand, Paraguay and Italy. He did not play in the round of 16 against the Netherlands due to yellow cards from previous games. He announced his retirement from international football in October 2010.

Honours
Žilina
 Corgoň Liga: 2002–03, 2003–04, 2006–07
 Slovak Super Cup: 2003, 2004, 2007

References

External links
Player profile at mskzilina.sk

1976 births
Living people
People from Krásno nad Kysucou
Sportspeople from the Žilina Region
Slovak footballers
Association football midfielders
Slovakia international footballers
2010 FIFA World Cup players
Slovak Super Liga players
Super League Greece players
FK Dukla Banská Bystrica players
MŠK Púchov players
MŠK Žilina players
Xanthi F.C. players
Spartak Myjava players
Slovak expatriate footballers
Slovak expatriate sportspeople in Greece
Expatriate footballers in Greece